The House of Crnojević (Serbian Cyrillic: Црнојевић,  Crnojevići / Црнојевићи) was a medieval Serbian noble family that held Zeta, or parts of it; a region north of Lake Skadar corresponding to southern Montenegro and northern Albania, from 1326 to 1362, then 1403 until 1515. Its progenitor Đuraš Ilijić was the head of Upper Zeta in the Medieval Kingdom of Serbia and Empire (r. 1326–1362†), under Stefan Dečanski, Dušan the Mighty and Stefan Uroš V. Đuraš was killed in 1362 by the Balšić family, the holders of Lower Zeta (since 1360); Zeta was in the hands of the Balšići under nominal Imperial rule until 1421, when Serbian Despot Stefan Lazarević was given the province by Balša III (1403–1421). The family fought its rivals following the murder of Đuraš, and the Crnojevićs controlled Budva from 1392 until 1396, when Radič Crnojević was murdered by the Balšićs. They are mentioned again in 1403, as vassals of the Republic of Venice, taking power in their hereditary lands.

History

Origins
The oldest known ancestor is Head Ilija. The family has been referred to as Đurašević (Đuraševići / Ђурашевићи), from Đuraš Ilijić, the son of Ilija, who was Head of Upper Zeta from 1326 until his death in 1362, when he was killed by the Balšić family. Although Đuraš Ilijić was an important figure in the Medieval Kingdom of Serbia, it was his grandson Đuraš Ilijić who became advisor of the Serbian King Stefan of Dečani in 1326. Five years later, Đuraš supported Prince Dušan Nemanjić in overthrowing the King.

In 1355, the Croatian duchess and sister of Emperor Dušan, Jelena Nemanjić Šubić, had come greatly under pressure by the Hungarian King who attacked one of her cities in Croatia, (Skradin). Emperor Dušan dispatched Đuraš Ilijić to relieve the siege. He left with an army and his two brothers, Nikola and Vladin, as well as his sons and nephews. Đuraš successfully kept the city up to January 10, 1356, when Emperor Uroš, Dušan's successor, ordered him to deliver it to the Venetians. Đuraš was liquidated by Balša I's sons as a rival in 1362. He was buried in the Church of Saint Michael on Prevlaka with the inscription "in Emperor's Stefan's name a fearsome knight" (Montenegrin and ).

After this, the Đuraševići were greatly suppressed by the Balšići. They ruled in the areas of Budva and the Gulf of Kotor. At times, they cooperated with the Balšić, but most frequently fought them for control.

Crnojević

Radič, the successor of Crnoje, emerged, together with his brothers Stefan and Dobrivoje, as the masters of Budva, at the end of the 14th century. He maintained close relations with the Republic of Dubrovnik, where he was a honorary citizen. At the same time, the relations with City of Kotor were bad. He frequently jeopardized Kotor and expanded his domain to include Grbalj and Paštrovići. As the Serbian Empire crumbled, the House of Crnoje became virtually independent in Upper Zeta (region around modern Cetinje. Radič was killed in combat in a war against the House of Balšić in 1396.

After the death of Radič, the Crnojevići, under the brothers Dobrivoj and Stefan, suffered a major decline. There were territorial losses to the Đuraševići, led by the brothers Đurađ and Aleksa (also called Lješ), both sons of the late Radič. They were first referred to in sources in 1403. They seemed to have been actively supporting Đurađ II's campaign against the Crnojevići in the late 1390s. They also played a major role in Sandalj Hranić's expulsion from Zeta through a campaign led by Đurađ. As a reward, Đurađ gave them Budva, as well as Saint Michael's Metohija (Grbalj). The Đuraševići used this period of support of the Balšićs to gain much of the Crnojević possessions in the mountains behind Kotor. Đuraš and Aleksa sided with Venetians and as their vassals ruled the area of Upper Zeta in 1403–1435.

The most important role in establishing the family's rule in Zeta had Stefan I called "Stefanica" (1451–1465). He used the turmoil in Zeta and managed to become de facto ruler of the region. He secured a leading position in his family and married Maria, Skenderbeg's sister. After the fall of the southern part of Serbia under the Turks in 1455, Stefan acknowledged Venetian rule in return for autonomy on internal affairs and autonomy for the Orthodox Metropolitan. His son Ivan (1465–1490), better known as Ivan-beg, started his rule with a war on the Venetians, but had to repent later in face of Turkish threat. He was forced to become a Turkish vassal in addition to being a Venetian one already. He was forced by Turks to flee to Italy in 1479 and managed to return only in 1481, again as the Turkish vassal. He moved the seat of Zeta Metropolitan from Prevlaka to the more secure Cetinje in 1485 and soon it became his capital.

Ivan's son Đurađ (1490–1496) remained consistent to his father's policies, although he married a daughter of a Venetian noble. He fostered the printing house of Cetinje monastery in which the first book in Serbian was printed in 1494. When his contacts with the King of France on starting an anti-Ottoman war became known to the Turks, he had to flee Montenegro, which fell under direct Turkish rule. He was an educated man known for his knowledge on many topics.

He was succeeded by his brother Stefan II (1496–1498) who led the administration of Montenegro for the Ottoman Empire. Ivan's third son Staniša, now islamized and renamed as Skender-beg, ruled his ancestral lands from 1513 to 1530 and was an obedient servant to the Sultan.

The descendants of Đurađ lived in Hungary and Venice where they died out in the mid-17th century.

Rulers
Lord of Zeta/Montenegro:
 Đuraš Ilijić (1326–1362†)
 Radič (fl. 1392-1396†)
 Đurađ III and Aleksa (1403–1435)
 Gojčin (1435-1451)
 Stefan I (1451–1465)
 Ivan I (1465–1490)
 Đurađ IV (1490–1496)
 Stefan II (1496–1498)
 Ivan II (1498–1515)
 Đurađ V (1515–1516)
Sanjak-bey of Montenegro:
 Staniša-Skenderbeg (1516-1530)

Family tree

Đuraš Vrančić
 Ilija Đurašević
Đuraš Ilijić
Crnoje Đurašević
 Radič Crnojević
Đurađ Đurašević Crnojević
Đurašin
Gojčin
Stefan (Stefanica) Crnojević
Đurađ Crnojević
 Charles Michael (Petar) Crnojevic
  Ivan Crnojević
Đurađ Crnojević
Solomon
Konstantin
Jovan
 Viktor
 Jovan
 Faustina
Ivan
 Đurađ V
Antonija married to Jerolim Zagurović
 Anđelo Zagurović
Unknown Daughter
 Unknown Daughter
Stefan
Staniša (Skenderbeg), Sanjak-bey of Montenegro
Unknown Daughter
 Unknown Daughter
 Unknown Son
 Aleksa (Lješ, Alexius) Đurašević Crnojević
Stefan
 Dobrovoj
Nikola
 Vladin

See also

List of rulers of Montenegro

References

Sources

 

 
Serbian noble families
People of the Serbian Despotate
Medieval Montenegro
Montenegrin noble families
League of Lezhë